The 1982 Grampian Regional Council election, the third election to the Grampian Regional Council, was held on Thursday 6 May 1982 as part of the wider 1982 Scottish regional elections. The election saw the Conservatives maintaining their dominance of the 54 seat Council, albeit with a reduced presence.

Aggregate results

Ward results

References

20th century in Aberdeen
1982
Grampian
May 1982 events in the United Kingdom